The Your World Awards for Your Favorite Lead Actress,  is a category created by Premios Tu Mundo, presented by Telemundo, to choose the best favorite actress of telenovelas. So far the only actress, who has won this award consecutively was Fernanda Castillo.

Winners and nominees

Novelas

Súper series (2015–16)

References 

Television awards for Best Actress
Awards established in 2012